Alexander Stewart Burton, VC (20 January 1893 – 9 August 1915) was an Australian recipient of the Victoria Cross, the highest award for gallantry in the face of the enemy that can be awarded to British and Commonwealth forces.

Early life
Burton was born at Kyneton, in the state of Victoria, on 20 January 1893. His father, a grocer, moved his family to Euroa where he commenced working for a department store. After completing his schooling, Alexander joined his father at the store, working in the ironmongers section.

First World War
Shortly after the outbreak of the First World War, Burton enlisted in the Australian Imperial Force on 18 August 1914 and posted to the 7th Battalion. He embarked with the battalion for the Middle East on 19 October 1914. On 25 April 1915, 7th Battalion landed at Gallipoli but Burton was sick and did not reach the frontlines until a week later. He was promoted to the rank of lance corporal on 10 July 1915 for "having volunteered and taken part in the forcing of Saphead D21 in the face of the enemy".

On 9 August 1915, Burton fought in the Battle of Lone Pine when his company reinforced newly captured Turkish trenches. Burton was one of a party of men that manned a barricade against attacking Turkish soldiers. Killed in this action, he was recommended by his battalion commander, Lieutenant Colonel Pompey Elliott, for the award of the Victoria Cross (VC).  Two other members of the party, Lieutenant Frederick Tubb and Corporal William Dunstan, were also awarded VCs. Burton's VC was gazetted on 15 October 1915; the citation read as follows:

Burton has no known grave and is commemorated on the Lone Pine Memorial. He was subsequently mentioned in despatches by General Sir Ian Hamilton on 28 January 1916.

The medal
In early 1916, the VC, along with a cover letter from King George V, was presented to Burton's father who later wore it for the homecoming of Frederick Tubb, who was a friend of Burton's, and had returned to Australia to convalesce from the wounds received at Lone Pine.   Burton's VC remained in his family for many years but in 1967, it was donated to the Australian War Memorial in Canberra, where it is on display.

Honours and awards

Notes

References
Walsh, G. P. 1979. 'Burton, Alexander Stewart (1893–1915)'. Australian Dictionary of Biography, Volume 7. Melbourne University Press: Melbourne.

External links
 
 Alexander Stewart BURTON, The AIF Project, www.aif.adfa.edu.au

1893 births
1915 deaths
Military personnel from Victoria (Australia)
Australian World War I recipients of the Victoria Cross
Australian Gallipoli campaign recipients of the Victoria Cross
Australian Army soldiers
Australian military personnel killed in World War I
People from Kyneton